The 20th CARIFTA Games was held in Port of Spain, Trinidad and Tobago on March 30-April 1, 1991.    An appraisal of the results has been given on the occasion of 40th anniversary of the games.

Participation (unofficial)

Detailed result lists can be found on the "World Junior Athletics History" website.  An unofficial count yields the number of about 212 athletes (128 junior (under-20) and 88 youth (under-17)) from about 18 countries:  Antigua and Barbuda (1), Bahamas (27), Barbados (26), Bermuda (6), British Virgin Islands (3), Cayman Islands (7), Dominica (3), French Guiana (3), Grenada (9), Guadeloupe (12), Guyana (5), Jamaica (42), Martinique (19), Saint Kitts and Nevis (3), Saint Lucia (3), Saint Vincent and the Grenadines (2), Trinidad and Tobago (39), US Virgin Islands (1).

Austin Sealy Award

The Austin Sealy Trophy for the most outstanding athlete of the games was awarded to Inez Turner from Jamaica.  She won 2 gold medals (400m, and 800m) in the junior (U-20) category.  In addition, she was probably part of at least one of the medal winning relay teams (there is no information on the team members).

Medal summary
Medal winners are published by category: Boys under 20 (Junior), Girls under 20 (Junior), Boys under 17 (Youth), and Girls under 17 (Youth).
Complete results can be found on the "World Junior Athletics History"
website.

Boys under 20 (Junior)

Girls under 20 (Junior)

Boys under 17 (Youth)

Girls under 17 (Youth)

Medal table (unofficial)

References

External links
World Junior Athletics History

CARIFTA Games
1991 in Trinidad and Tobago sport
CARIFTA
1991 in Caribbean sport
International athletics competitions hosted by Trinidad and Tobago